Distance (born Greg Sanders) is a British dubstep producer and DJ. He also founded the record label Chestplate, whose sonic direction followed his style, fusing metal influences with dubstep templates.

Distance's involvement in Mary Anne Hobbs' 2006 BBC Radio 1 Dubstep Warz show lead to wider notoriety for him and also the genre as a whole. He is also known for having worked with artists such as Skream and Benga. His style is noted for being dark and full of distortion.

Career

Chestplate Records
Distance founded Chestplate in 2007.

Artists

 Distance 
 Skream 
 Caspa & Rusko 
 Benga 
 Cyrus 
 Tunnidge 
 Sleeper 
 Razor Rekta 
 District 
 Mesck 
 Leon Switch

Discography

Albums 
My Demons (2007)
Repercussions (2008)
Dynamis (2016)
Forgotten Demons (2021)

Extended plays 
Trust My Logic/Horizon (2003)
Nomad (2004)
Studio Gangsters (2004)
Closer than you think (2004)
Replicant (2005)
1 on 1/Empire (2005)
Bahl Fwd/Temptations (with Skream) (2006)
Travels/Wiseman (with Skream) (2006)
Traffic/Cyclops (2006)
Fallen/Taipan (2006)
Feel me/Battle sequence (2007)
Political Warfare/Radical (with Skream) (2007)
Fallen (Vex'd remix) (2007)
Aqualung/Nomad (Scuba remix) (2007)
Headstrung/No sunshine (2008)
V/Present day (2008)
Victim Support/Misfit (2008)
Violate/Silence (2008) (with Cyrus)
Night Vision/Traffic (remixes) (2009)
Twilight/V (Pinch remix) (2009)
Clockwork/One Blood, One source (Distance remix) (with Pinch) (2009)
Choke Hold/Surrender (with Benga and Cyrus) (2009)
Skys Alight/ 1 Regret (2009)
Menace/Beyond (2010)
Falling (2010)
No warning/Jungle fears (2010)
Meanstreak (2011)
A result of sound/ Desterted (2012)
Blue Meanie/Searching (2012)
Reboot/Bazurk (2012)
Aftershock/Blame (with Tunnidge) (2012)
Troubles/Rugged (2012)
Set you free/Gorilla Force (2013)
Outer Limits (2014)
Long Live the Groove (2015)
Survivors (2016)
Clash/Scratch The Surface (2017)
Awaken (2019)
Sacrifices (2021)

References

External links
Chestplate Records Official Webpage

English DJs
English record producers
Dubstep musicians
Living people
Musicians from London
Year of birth missing (living people)
Place of birth missing (living people)
Electronic dance music DJs
Planet Mu artists